The 2019 Adrian Flux British FIM Speedway Grand Prix was the ninth and penultimate race of the 2019 Speedway Grand Prix season. It took place on 21 September at the Principality Stadium in Cardiff, Wales.

Riders 
First reserve Robert Lambert replaced Greg Hancock. The Speedway Grand Prix Commission nominated Charles Wright as the wild card, and Danny King and Chris Harris both as Track Reserves.

Results 
The Grand Prix was won by Leon Madsen, who beat Emil Sayfutdinov, Bartosz Zmarzlik and Jason Doyle in the final. It was the second win Grand Prix win of Madsen's career.

Sayfutdinov and Madsen both closed in on overall leader Zmarzlik by claiming 17 points, however the Pole's third place meant he took a nine-point lead into the final round of the year in Toruń (see intermediate classification table below).

Heat details

Intermediate classification

References

See also 

Great Britain
Speedway Grand Prix
Sports competitions in Cardiff
Speedway Grand Prix of Great Britain
Speedway Grand Prix of Great Britain